The Giancana Story is the third solo album by American rapper Kool G Rap, released by Koch Records on November 26, 2002. Its producers included Bink, Buckwild, Jaz-O, Knobody, Rockwilder and V.I.C., while AZ, Capone-N-Noreaga, Havoc, Joell Ortiz and Prodigy were amongst the guest vocalists.

Background
After contributing to the Hip Hop for Respect project, a collection of rappers who released an EP to protest against police brutality, and performing the opening verse on the single "One Four Love Pt. 1", Kool G Rap's critically acclaimed turn on the track led to a deal with Rawkus Records. The Giancana Story was intended to be his debut album on the label and was initially set to be released in October 2000. However, the release of the album was delayed for over two years while Rawkus sorted out its increasingly labyrinthine label affiliations and the album was eventually licensed to a Koch Records subsidiary and finally received its debut on November 26, 2002.

The version of the album recorded for Rawkus and the one released by Koch vary greatly; there were more songs cut from the Koch version than were left on it, and a number of songs were retitled when included the Koch's album. "First Nigga", "First Nigga (DJ Premier Remix)" (which was a B-side on "The Streets" single), "Ride On" featuring Jagged Edge, "G Rap Is a Villain" featuring Ma Barker, "This Is My Life" featuring Capone-N-Noreaga, "Round & Round (Remix)" featuring Jonell, "Keep Goin'" featuring Snoop Dogg and Devin the Dude, "How It Feel" featuring Havoc, "Y'all Niggas" featuring Black Guerilla Family (which was released as a bonus track and renamed "Planet of the Apes" on the Japanese release of the Koch album), "This Means War", a version of "Holla Back" which included Nas and excluded Tito, "Nobody Can't Eat" (which was a B-side on the "My Life" single), "Ordinary Love" featuring Ma Barker, "Why You Gotta Do It Like That" featuring Ma Barker and "Thug Out" featuring Black Child, Caddillac Tah, Ma Barker and Jinx (the original version of "Spill Blood" which was released as a B-side to the "It's Nothing" single) were at least some of the songs which were recorded for Rawkus but not included on the album by Koch.

Three songs from Koch's version of The Giancana Story were released as singles; "The Streets" (which came with "Thug For Life" as a B-side) in 2001, "My Life" in 2002 and "It's Nothing" (with "Spill Blood" as a B-side) in 2003. The album, however, was not very commercially successful by not making it to the Billboard 200 and peaking at the Top R&B/Hip-Hop Albums charts at #63. "First Nigga", "Keep Going" and "Ride On" from the original Rawkus album were also released as promo singles.

Although he had previously stated that the "G" in his name stood for "genius", Kool G Rap states on the track "Drama (Bitch Nigga)":

Reception
The Giancana Story received generally positive reviews from music critics. John Bush from AllMusic gave the album a rating of four out of five, saying "The Giancana Story proves that time means nothing to one of the greatest rappers ever (though Rawkus took it too far when they declared "the game was named after him"). Don't call it a comeback because he never left but Kool G's third solo record illustrates the rare case of the hip-hop world moving closer to a veteran than when he made his breakout. What sounded refreshing and genuinely unique in 1990 was becoming nearly ubiquitous by the end of the millennium, and besides slipping in a few more words per line than he used to, the first real hardcore rapper hasn't changed his style a whit (or needed to)" and describing the albums's sound as "pure hardcore rap, with all the dark intelligence and heavy venom hip-hop fans expect from a master".

HipHopDX's Afrikka also scored the album as four out of five and said "Kool G Rap once again proves he is an incredible storyteller and rhymesayer. With the Giancanna Story you have an album every serious fan should not be without. The farthest thing from a disappointment, there is no filler material, no water-me-down interludes, just pure music. One would be foolish not to have this album in their collection making it an easy recommendation".

Steve "Flash" Juon of RapReviews rated The Giancana Story at 7½ out of ten, noting "This album is not quite as strong as 1998's highly slept on Roots of Evil CD or seminal classics like Live and Let Die, but if you want to get your first taste of the Mario Puzo of hip-hop, it's a great place to start".

Track listing

Sample credits
 "The Fix" contains a sample from "No Love in the Room" by The 5th Dimension.
 "My Life" contains a sample from "Fania All Stars' Cha Cha Cha" by Fania All Stars.
 "Thug Chronicles" contains a sample from "Fourth Movement: Passacaglia" by Yusef Lateef

Personnel 
Credits for The Giancana Story adapted from Allmusic.

Musicians 
 Kool G Rap – vocals, lyrics
 AZ – vocals
 Azz Izz – vocals
 Capone – vocals
 Havoc – vocals, lyrics
 Jinx da Juvy – vocals
 Nawz – vocals
 Noreaga – vocals
 Joell Ortiz – vocals
 Prodigy – vocals
 Shaqueen – vocals
 Tito – vocals

Additional personnel 
 Dr. Butcher - producer, composer
 Amar Pep – producer, composer
 J.R. Baxter – composer
 Michael Benabib – photography
 Bink – producer
 J.T. Burks – composer
 Cochese – mixing
 Chris Conway – engineering, mixing
 J. Crespo – composer
 The Ghetto Pros – mixing, producer
 Jeff Gilligan – package design
 R. Harrell – composer
 Mike Heron – A&R, producer
 Robin Hill – sample clearance
 Jaz-O – producer
 Robin Hill – sample clearance
 Frank Nitti – producer
 Matt Quinn – engineer
 Rockwilder – producer, composer
 Duncan Stanbury – mixing
 Tommy Uzzo – mixing
 Max Vargas – engineer
 Doug Wilson – engineer, mixing
 Young Lord – producer
 Carlisle Young – engineer

Charts

Album

Singles

References

External links
 The Giancana Story at Discogs

2002 albums
E1 Music albums
Kool G Rap albums
East Coast hip hop albums
Gangsta rap albums by American artists
Hardcore hip hop albums
Albums produced by Bink (record producer)
Albums produced by Buckwild
Albums produced by Jaz-O
Albums produced by Rockwilder
Mafioso rap albums
Cultural depictions of Sam Giancana